Stoutsburg used to be an unincorporated community in Wheatfield Township, Jasper County, Indiana, United States.  It is now a woodland preserve.

History
George W. Stout established Stoutsburg, and lent it his name. Stoutsburg was made a station on the railroad built through that territory in the early 1880s.

A post office called Stoutsberg (different spelling) opened in 1890, and remained in operation until it was discontinued in 1910.

Geography

References

Unincorporated communities in Jasper County, Indiana
Unincorporated communities in Indiana